A bili light is a light therapy tool to treat newborn jaundice (hyperbilirubinemia).  High levels of bilirubin can cause brain damage (kernicterus), leading to cerebral palsy, auditory neuropathy, gaze abnormalities and dental enamel hypoplasia. The therapy uses a blue light (420–470 nm) that converts bilirubin into an (E,Z)-isomer that can be excreted in the urine and feces. Soft goggles are put on the child to reduce eye damage from the high intensity light. The baby is kept naked or only wearing a diaper, and is turned over frequently to expose more of the skin.

Conventional bili lights shine from above the baby. A biliblanket consists of a fiber-optic blanket designed to transfer the light from a lamp unit all around the baby's body, and is more commonly used at home.

References

Light therapy